This is a list of Danish television related events from 2006.

Events
11 February - Sidsel Ben Semmane is selected to represent Denmark at the 2006 Eurovision Song Contest with her song "Twist of Love". She is selected to be the thirty-fourth Danish Eurovision entry during Dansk Melodi Grand Prix held at the Gigantium in Aalborg.
17 November - Olympic gold medal handball player Christina Roslyng and her partner Steen Lund win the third season of Vild med dans.

Debuts

Television shows

1990s
Hvem vil være millionær? (1999–present)

2000s
Klovn (2005-2009)
Vild med dans (2005–present)

Ending this year
The Eagle (2004-2006)

Births

Deaths

See also
 2006 in Denmark